Noel Robinson (born 23 December 1941) is a Trinidadian cricketer. He played in six first-class matches for Trinidad and Tobago from 1961 to 1977.

See also
 List of Trinidadian representative cricketers

References

External links
 

1941 births
Living people
Trinidad and Tobago cricketers